Stanislav Igorevich Nikitin (born 22 June 1995) is a Russian freestyle skier. He competed in the 2018 Winter Olympics.

His sister Liubov Nikitina is also a freestyle skier.

References

External links

1995 births
Living people
Freestyle skiers at the 2018 Winter Olympics
Freestyle skiers at the 2022 Winter Olympics
Russian male freestyle skiers
Olympic freestyle skiers of Russia
Universiade silver medalists for Russia
Universiade medalists in freestyle skiing
Competitors at the 2019 Winter Universiade
Sportspeople from Yaroslavl